The Evangel 4500 was a 1960s American twin-engined light passenger/cargo monoplane built by the Evangel Aircraft Corporation.

Development
The Evangel Aircraft Corporation was established to design and build a bush aircraft particularly for use by missionary groups. For work in South America it had to have STOL capability and be simple to operate and maintain. The aircraft that was designed was designated the Evangel 4500-300 and was a twin-engined monoplane with a tailwheel  
configuration retractable landing gear. The prototype first flew in June 1964 and the first production aircraft in January 1969. The aircraft needs a very short take-off run and can achieve a take-off to 50ft (15m) within 375yds (343m).

Variants
4500
The sole prototype, with a high strut braced wing and tricycle undercarriage.
4500-300
Production variant
4500-300-II
Used to identify aircraft fitted with turbochargers.

Specifications

See also

References
Citations

Bibliography
 Taylor, John W. R. Jane's All The World's Aircraft 1971–72. London: Sampson Low, Marston & Co, 1971. .
 The Illustrated Encyclopedia of Aircraft (Part Work 1982-1985), 1985, Orbis Publishing

External links
Evangel 4500 historical website

4500
1960s United States civil utility aircraft
Low-wing aircraft
Aircraft first flown in 1964
Twin piston-engined tractor aircraft